Gerhard Walter (born 27 September 1915; date of death unknown) was a Swiss footballer who played two seasons for FC Basel in the early 1930s. He played as goalkeeper.

Walter joined Basel's first team in 1931. He played his domestic league debut for the club in the home game at the Landhof on 30 August 1931 as Basel lost 1–4 against Young Fellows Zürich.

In the two Basel seasons 1931–32 and 1932–33 Walter played a total of eight games for Basel Six of these games were in the Swiss Serie A and two in the Swiss Cup.

References

Sources
 Rotblau: Jahrbuch Saison 2017/2018. Publisher: FC Basel Marketing AG. 
 Die ersten 125 Jahre. Publisher: Josef Zindel im Friedrich Reinhardt Verlag, Basel. 
 Verein "Basler Fussballarchiv" Homepage

FC Basel players
Swiss men's footballers
Association football goalkeepers
1915 births
Year of death missing
Swiss football managers
FC Luzern managers
Grasshopper Club Zürich managers